The Fur Formation is a marine geological formation of Ypresian (Lower Eocene Epoch, c. 56.0-54.5 Ma) age which crops out in the Limfjord region of Denmark from Silstrup via Mors and Fur to Ertebølle, and can be seen in many cliffs and quarries in the area. The Diatomite Cliffs (moler in Danish) is on the Danish list of tentative candidates for World Heritage and may become a world Heritage site.

Geology
The Fur Formation is a unit of diatomitic sediment approximately 60 meters thick consisting of diatoms and clay minerals with up to 180 layers of volcanic ash. In Danish literature the formation has informally been referred to as the moler (Ler means clay). The diatomite comprises 2/3 opal tests of diatoms and 1/3 clay, interbedded with layers of volcanic ash and a few limestone horizons (‘cementstones’), and has exceptionally complete fossil preservation.

It is known for its abundant fossil fish, insects, reptiles, birds and plants. The Fur Formation was deposited just above the Palaeocene-Eocene boundary, about 55 million years ago, and its tropical or sub-tropical flora indicate that the climate after the Paleocene-Eocene Thermal Maximum was moderately warm (approximately 4-8 degrees warmer than today).

Glacial activity has moved and folded all exposed moler in a complicated pattern which permits very precise mapping of glacial movement at the end of the last ice age, and has, due to the ash layers, created an extraordinary pedagogical case for studying tectonics.

Members
The Fur Formation is divided into two members: 
The lower Knudeklint Member was named for a location on the island of Fur. The upper Silstrup Member was named for a location in Thy. The stratigraphy exposed at Knudeklint constitutes the unit that containing the Paleocene/Eocene boundary informally named Stolleklint Clay, which grades up into the Fur Formation.

Paleontological significance 
Fossils of great diversity and unique preservation (only 10 my. after the ‘great extinction’ of dinosaurs, ammonites etc.) Most unusual, if not unique, diversity of life from both ocean and land with extremely good preservation of details rarely seen, therefore very reliable reconstruction of palaeobiology. By far most of the important ‘Danekræ’ fossils since 1990 have been found in the ‘Mo-clay area’.

Birds 
The earliest Paleogene fauna of any diversity, over 30 species, including some near complete, some preserved in 3-D, and some excellent bird-fossils (even with feathers and chromatine). Most are earliest known representatives of their orders (e.g. Trogons, Swifts, Ibises) and all are terrestrial birds.

 †Lithornithiformes
 Galliformes
 Gruiformes
 Rallidae
 †Messelornithidae
 Apodiformes (Swifts)
 Charadriiformes
 Psittaciformes
 Musophagiformes
 Coliiformes
 Strigiformes
 Caprimulgiformes
 Coraciiformes
 Trogoniformes
 Primoscenidae
 Trogonidae
†Septentrogon madseni

Reptiles 
Several fossil sea turtles are known from the Fur Formation. In one of them, a large leatherback turtle (Eosphargis breineri) remains of soft tissue and skin pigmentation have been recovered A number of well-preserved turtle specimens have been recovered from the Fur Formation, two of which have been recognized to be a completely new species of the genus Tasbacka

Sea snakes are also known from the Fur Formation. 

 Palaeophis (Sea Snake)
 Eosphargisbrenieri (Leatherback turtle) )
 Cheloniidae
 †Puppigerus
 Glarichelys

Fish 
Large teleostean fauna, oceanic, possibly including earliest truly deep water fish, a ‘whale-fish’; earliest members of many living families and Tertiary diversity preserved as complete skeletons; some rare and sensational large and complete specimens (two ‘bony tongues’, one tarpon.

Archaeozeus
Protozeus

Insects 
Huge fauna from land, over 200 species, many are oldest of their families; many with colour spots and eye lenses, some extraordinary preservation with stridulation (sound) apparatus in grasshoppers, and apparently migratory moth mass mortality.

Species described include:
Cimbrophlebia bittaciformis - a Cimbrophlebiid scorpionfly
Limfjordia breineri - A dictyopharid plant hopper
Forficula paleocaenica - a forficulid earwig
Ypresiomyrma rebekkae - a bull dog ant

Crustacea 
Extraordinary cirripeds (barnacles), and the only fossil shrimps from Denmark.

Molluscs 
 Gari sp.
 Mytilus sp.
 Nucula sp.

Land plants 
Some members of the ‘Arcto-Tertiary flora’; some with cuticle preservation and some flowers preserved. Large silicified trunks (up to 9 m) of redwood, and some very soft wood preserved. Some trunks with mussels and barnacles attached. Many seeds and fruits.

Diatoms 
Great diversity of unicellular, marine algae with siliceous (opal) tests, 130 species.

Ash layers
More than 200 layers of volcanic ash of predominantly basaltic composition have been found within the Mo-clay of the Fur Formation. 179 of the most prominent ash layers have been numbered. Comparison with volcanic ash layers in oil wells in the North Sea indicates that the Mo-clay is coeval with the Sele Formation and Balder Formation in the North Sea. The ash layers have also been found at other sites in Denmark, England, Austria and the Bay of Biscay.

The total eruption volume of this series have been calculated as 21,000 km3, which occurred in 600,000 years. The most powerful single eruption of this series took place 54.0 million years ago (Ma) and ejected ca. 1,200 km3 of ash material, which makes it one of the largest basaltic pyroclastic eruptions in geological history.

See also
 List of fossiliferous stratigraphic units in Denmark

References

External links

Fur Formation
Fossil parks
Paleontology in Denmark